Carnbee is a village and rural parish in the inland part of the East Neuk of Fife, Scotland.

Location
It lies to the north of Anstruther and Pittenweem. There is a very small village and the church (dating from 1793) stands amid agricultural land. The hamlet of Arncroach lies within this parish. It has a nearby cheese factory.

The name Carnbee derives from Scottish Gaelic. The second element, -bee, is obscure but probably derives from the Gaelic beith meaning 'birch' giving: "the cairn of (the) birch tree".

The parish includes Kellie Castle, formerly the seat of the Earls of Kellie and home to the Lorimer family, including Robert Lorimer who designed the pulpit in the parish church and the Carnbee War Memorial.

References

Villages in Fife
Parishes in Fife